Spruceanthus theobromae is a species of liverwort in the family Lejeuneaceae. It is endemic to Ecuador. Its natural habitat is lowland evergreen forest, and it is threatened by habitat loss.  A 2000 IUCN assessment reported it remained only on five tree trunks at one site, and characterized it as Critically Endangered.

A 2001 study found Spruceanthus theobromae on tree trunks at 12 different cacao plantations, across an area of approximately 400 km2 at the foot of the Andes in Ecuador, and concluded that the species properly qualifies as Near Threatened, not as currently threatened or endangered.

References

Flora of Ecuador
Lejeuneaceae
Critically endangered plants
Taxonomy articles created by Polbot